IF Trion is a Swedish football club located in Spjutsbygd.

Background
IF Trion currently plays in Division 4 Blekinge which is the sixth tier of Swedish football. They play their home matches at the Spjutsbygds IP in Spjutsbygd.

The women's soccer team was played in the Swedish top division in 2002 and 2003.

The club is affiliated to Blekinge Fotbollförbund. IF Trion have competed in the Svenska Cupen on 13 occasions.

Season to season

Footnotes

External links
 IF Trion – Official website

Football clubs in Blekinge County
Association football clubs established in 1936
1936 establishments in Sweden